The Harold Pig Memorial is the second studio album by Ohio alternative rock band Circus Devils, released in 2002.  Conceived as a concept album, each song depicts an episode in the life of biker Harold Pig as told by Harold's friends at his wake.

Reception 
"the album has an epic sweep to it which makes it feel like a journey.  While the nonsequitors and genuinely creepy stretches make Circus Devils' music likely too odd for your average music fan, this isn't a hapless "side project" but an intricate, intoxicating epic showcasing a unique, hybrid form of rock."
- Dave Heaton / Erasing Clouds

"(Robert) Pollard's patented vocal hooks are sprinkled throughout and vicious guitar solos add to the Devils' sweeping sense of barely controlled chaos. The tone of the album remains dark and is again done on a grand soundtrack scale, but whereas Ringworm Interiors had a menacing, unsettling, perhaps David Lynchian feel, The Harold Pig Memorial has a more unifying, often suitably funereal (but still unsettling), musical theme woven throughout." 
- Karen E. Graves / [ allmusic.com]

Track listing
 Alaska to Burning Men
 Saved Herself, Shaved Herself
 Soldiers of June
 I Guess I Needed That
 Festival of Death
 Dirty World News
 May We See the Hostage
 Do You Feel Legal?
 A Birdcage Until Further Notice
 Injured?
 Foxhead Delivery
 Last Punk Standing
 Bull Spears
 Discussions in the Cave
 Recirculating Hearse
 Pigs Can't Hide (On Their Day Off)
 Exoskeleton Motorcade
 Real Trip No.3
 Vegas
 The Pilot's Crucifixion / Indian Oil
 Tulip Review
 The Harold Pig Memorial

References

External links 
 the Official Circus Devils site
 [ Circus Devils at allmusic.com]

Circus Devils albums
Concept albums
2002 albums